Raymond Henry Arnold Davison Love (11 May 1888 – 12 October 1962) was an English first-class cricketer. Love was a right-handed batsman who bowled right-arm medium pace.

Love represented Hampshire in two first-class matches in 1923 against local rival Sussex and Nottinghamshire.

Love died in Pyrford, Surrey on 12 October 1962.

External links
Raymond Love at Cricinfo
Raymond Love at CricketArchive

1888 births
1962 deaths
Sportspeople from Chatham, Kent
English cricketers
Hampshire cricketers